Pseudonoorda is a genus of moths of the family Crambidae.

Species

References

Natural History Museum Lepidoptera genus database

Eurrhypini
Crambidae genera
Taxa named by Eugene G. Munroe